Nkeyema District is a district of Western Province, Zambia. It was separated from Kaoma District in 2012.

References 

Districts of Western Province, Zambia